Chlamydophila is a controversial bacterial genus belonging to the family Chlamydiaceae.

Taxonomy

All Chlamydiota are anaerobic bacteria with a biphasic developmental lifecycle that depends on obligately intracellular growth in eukaryotic host cells. 

Chlamydophila was recognized by a number of scientists in 1999, with six species in Chlamydophila and three in the original genus, Chlamydia. This was immediately seen as controversial.  In 2015 the Chlamydophila species were reclassified as Chlamydia. The history of the classification and reclassification is as follows.

Earlier criteria for differentiation of chlamydial species did not always work well. For example, at that time genus C. psittaci was distinguished from C. trachomatis by sulfadiazine resistance, although not all strains identified as C. psittaci at the time were resistant, and C. pneumoniae was classified by its appearance under electron microscopy (EM) and its ability to infect humans, although the EM appearance may differ from one research group to the next, and many of these species infected humans.

The systematic taxonomy established for Chlamydiota (formerly Chlamydiae) in 1999 used DNA-DNA reassociation, 16S and 23S ribosomal RNA gene similarity, sequence similarity clustering of protein coding genes, and genome size as criteria for classification. Supporting criteria such as antigen detection, glycogen staining, host association, and EM morphology were also employed, depending on applicability and availability. 

Comparative genomic analyses in 2006 identified a number of signature proteins that were uniquely present in species from the genera Chlamydia and Chlamydophila, which supported the distinctness of Chlamydophila. This view was challenged three years later by newer whole genome analysis techniques leading to a proposal to "reunite the Chlamydiaceae into a single genus, Chlamydia". By the 2010s this reclassification "was not wholly accepted or adopted" among microbiologists, which "resulted in a reversion to the single, original genus Chlamydia, which now encompasses all 9 species including Chlamydia psittaci." As of 2013, Chlamydophila was still mentioned in some databases, but controversial. The merger of the genus Chlamydophila back into the genus Chlamydia is now generally accepted.

Chlamydophila differentiation
According to the authors of the 1999 study, the mean DNA-DNA reassociation difference distinguishing Chlamydophila from Chlamydia is 10.1%, an accepted value for genus separation. Although the 16S ribosomal RNA gene sequences of the two are close to 95% identical, unlike the other previously established genera, the authors considered a less than 95% similarity only a guideline for establishing new genera in chlamydial families. In the study, the authors used the similarity of the locations of coding for protein and ribosomal RNA genes in the genome (gene clusters) to help distinguish Chlamydophila from Chlamydia. Also, the full-length 23S ribosomal RNA genes of the species of the two genera were less than 95% identical.

Phylogeny

See also
 List of bacterial orders
 List of bacteria genera

References

External links
Chlamydophila genomes and related information at PATRIC, a Bioinformatics Resource Center funded by   NIAID
Taxonomic Outline of the Procaryotes, Bergey's Manual of Systematic Bacteriology, Second Edition Release 1.0, April c.  

Chlamydiota
Bacteria genera